Mark Bell (born August 5, 1980) is a Canadian ice hockey coach and a former professional ice hockey forward. Bell was selected by the Chicago Blackhawks in the first round (8th overall) of the 1998 NHL Entry Draft. In the NHL, Bell played for the Blackhawks, San Jose Sharks, Toronto Maple Leafs, and Anaheim Ducks. Later in his career, he played in Switzerland and Germany.

Playing career
Bell started playing hockey at the age of four years, and grew up admiring Wayne Gretzky and Doug Gilmour. He played four seasons in the minor Ontario Hockey League with the Ottawa 67's, and was part of the Memorial Cup championship in 1998–99. Bell was a bronze medalist with Team Canada at the 2000 World Junior Hockey Championships.

Chicago Blackhawks
He was drafted by the Chicago Blackhawks in the 1998 NHL Entry Draft as the eighth overall pick. He scored his first goal against Patrick Roy. Bell's time with Chicago was moderately successful, forming a partnership with fellow  Tyler Arnason and Kyle Calder on a line nicknamed the "ABC line". The trio were considered the future for a rebuilding Blackhawks team, but never met expectations and in 2006, both Bell and Calder would be traded away. During the 2004–05 NHL lockout, Bell played with the Trondheim Black Panthers in the Norwegian UPC-ligaen, recording 16 goals and 39 points in 36 games. He scored 72 goals and 151 points in 339 games with the Blackhawks and 25 goals and 48 points in his final year.

San Jose Sharks
In the summer of 2006, Bell was traded to the San Jose Sharks in a three-way deal involving Chicago and the Ottawa Senators Bell signed a three-year US$6.5 million contract July 2006. Prior to the start of training camp, Bell was arrested and charged after being in a collision while driving under the influence (DUI). He was initially placed on a line with Joe Thornton and Jonathan Cheechoo in his first year, but broke a bone in his wrist in the second game of the regular season. Bell never lived up to expectations and could not duplicate the numbers that he put up in Chicago scoring only 11 times and accumulating 21 points in 71 games and was often a healthy scratch in the playoffs.

Toronto Maple Leafs
Bell was acquired by the Toronto Maple Leafs along with Vesa Toskala via trade at the 2007 NHL Entry Draft on June 22, 2007 for three draft picks. After becoming part of the Leafs, Bell was then suspended the first 15 games for his DUI conviction. He was reinstated by the NHL and was eligible to play his first game for the Maple Leafs on November 6, 2007. He played just 35 games with the Maple Leafs, suffering a facial fracture that required surgery and was unable to regain his form. The following year, he failed to break into the team during training camp and on October 6, 2008, Bell was placed on waivers which cleared the way for him being assigned to Toronto's AHL affiliate, the Toronto Marlies.

New York Rangers
On February 25, 2009, Bell was placed on re-entry waivers by the Maples Leafs and was claimed by the New York Rangers. He was then assigned to the Rangers' AHL team, the Hartford Wolf Pack to make room for fellow waiver claim Sean Avery who had been claimed from the Dallas Stars. He was not re-signed at the end of the season.

Switzerland 
He was invited to Philadelphia Flyers training camp on a professional tryout on September 2. Bell was released from camp on September 22 after refusing to sign a two-way contract to play in the AHL. On September 28, 2009 he signed with Nationalliga A club Kloten Flyers in Switzerland. He played 108 games in two seasons with Kloten. During his time in Switzerland, Bell played for Team Canada at the 2009 and 2010 Spengler Cups.

Anaheim Ducks 
On July 20, 2011, Bell signed a one-year two-way contract to return to North America with the Anaheim Ducks of the NHL. He was invited to the Ducks' training camp, but was assigned to Anaheim's AHL affiliate, the Syracuse Crunch on September 25, 2011. On January 20, 2012, Bell was recalled from Syracuse. After five games with the Ducks, in which he was scoreless, he was reassigned to the Crunch for the remainder of the season.

Germany 
On September 19, 2012, Bell ventured to Europe signing a one-year deal with the Iserlohn Roosters of the German DEL. After not being able to renegotiate his contract with the Roosters, Bell signed with the Eisbären Berlin prior to the 2013–14 season. In the late stages of the 2014–15 season, Bell sustained a concussion which sidelined him for a while, followed by a long-term ankle injury. These health issues kept him from playing for almost one year, he made his comeback in late January 2016. At the end of the 2015–16 season, Bell retired from professional ice hockey.

Coaching career 
In July 2016, Bell joined the coaching staff of the St. Marys Jr. ‘B’ Lincolns as an assistant.

Legal trouble
During the 2006 Labor Day weekend, in Milpitas, California, Bell's rented Toyota Camry was traveling an estimated  when it rear-ended a pickup truck at a stop sign driven by Jose Luis Villafana, the latter's vehicle being hit  up a steep hill and wrapped it around a telephone pole. The victim was uninsured and unlicensed and suffered multiple head, back and leg injuries in the crash. Bell was arrested shortly after walking away from the accident. He blew .201 in a breathalyzer test about a half-hour after the accident, and a blood test revealed a blood-alcohol level of 0.15, considerably higher than the legal limit of 0.08.

Bell was charged with hit and run and driving under the influence. Both are felony offences. His arraignment was set for January 3, 2007. Bell pleaded no contest to drunk driving causing injury and hit-and-run on August 14, 2007. Prior to sentencing, Bell had to pay restitution, including medical bills and the cost of the vehicle to Villafana, who has also filed a civil suit seeking "unlimited damages" which was later settled out of court. He was to serve six months in jail after completing the 2007–08 hockey season but later told to work in a California jail which he did from June 2, 2008 to August 15, 2008.

In addition to his conviction, Bell was placed in Stage 2 of the NHL/NHLPA Substance Abuse Program and was suspended for 15 games without pay by the NHL on September 12, 2007. NHL commissioner Gary Bettman justified the suspension, saying "Playing in the National Hockey League is a privilege, and with that privilege comes a corresponding responsibility for exemplary conduct off the ice as well as on it". The NHLPA disagreed, saying "there is no legitimate purpose served by adding a substantial league disciplinary suspension to the severe sanctions that have already been imposed". Leafs general manager John Ferguson, Jr., who drew criticism for the trade, had anticipated that Bell would face some sort of suspension, however based upon past precedent they did not expect it to be so lengthy. This had been suggested as a sign that the NHL was imposing stricter discipline for off-ice antics of players, after Michael Vick was expelled from the NFL as a result of his conviction for running a dog-fighting ring.

Bell has stated that as a result of the accident, realizing that his career was slipping away because of his irresponsibility, he had changed his lifestyle and had been sober since then, saying "Now, every day I wake up I realize I'm living a dream. It's taken a while for me to understand that. Now that I have, I'm going to grab it. My fun now is at the rink".

Career statistics

Regular season and playoffs

International

References

External links

1980 births
Living people
Anaheim Ducks players
Arizona Coyotes coaches
Arizona Coyotes scouts
21st-century Canadian criminals
Canadian male criminals
Canadian expatriate ice hockey players in Germany
Canadian expatriate ice hockey players in Norway
Canadian expatriate ice hockey players in Switzerland
Canadian ice hockey left wingers
Chicago Blackhawks draft picks
Chicago Blackhawks players
Eisbären Berlin players
Hartford Wolf Pack players
Ice hockey people from Ontario
Iserlohn Roosters players
EHC Kloten players
National Hockey League first-round draft picks
Norfolk Admirals players
Ottawa 67's players
People from Perth County, Ontario
San Jose Sharks players
Syracuse Crunch players
Toronto Maple Leafs players
Toronto Marlies players
Trondheim Black Panthers players